Gazabad (also Romanized as Gazābād) is a village in Dowlatabad Rural District, in the Central District of Jiroft County, Kerman Province, Iran. At the 2006 census, its population was 114, in 24 families.

References 

Populated places in Jiroft County